Thalavadi (Tamil:தாளவாடி) is a hilly town located close to the Dhimbham hills of Erode District in Tamil Nadu, India. Situated 823 metres above sealevel it has a salubrious weather most of the year. Previously part of Sathyamangalam taluk, it was separated & made a separate Taluk in 2016. It is the least populous Taluk of Erode District and is close to the BRT Wildlife sanctuary where the Western Ghats and Eastern Ghats converge.

Dodda Gajanur in Thalavadi taluk is the birthplace of late Kannada Superstar Dr.Rajkumar.

Thalavadi is the main commercial centre for the newly formed taluk. Five roads connect it to the NH209, the first one via Bisalvadi to Venkataiahnachatra, second one via Yelekatte to Chikkahole , third one via Ramapura, fourth one via Gumtapura and the fifth one via Doddapura to Dhimbam. Only the last road runs entirely in Tamilnadu. All other roads exit through Karnataka. Thalavadi - Dhimbam road runs through core area of Satyamangalam wildlife sanctuary, and the entry is restricted, except for state run transport buses and private vehicles with permission.

References

  

Villages in Erode district